Babilla, Idlib  is a Syrian village located in Maarrat al-Nu'man Nahiyah in Maarrat al-Nu'man District, Idlib.  According to the Syria Central Bureau of Statistics (CBS), Babilla, Idlib had a population of 2536 in the 2004 census. The population was reported to be 2,433 in January, 2018.  In 2019 a medical center in Babilla was one of four centers in Idlib that received dialysis equipment as part of a project funded by the World Health Organization, with a fifth center in Darat Izza in western rural Aleppo.

References 

Populated places in Maarat al-Numan District